Virginia's 16th Senate district is one of 40 districts in the Senate of Virginia. It has been represented by Democrat Joe Morrissey since 2020, following his defeat of incumbent Rosalyn Dance in the 2019 Democratic primary.

Geography
District 16 is a majority-Black district in the Greater Richmond Region, including all of the cities of Hopewell and Petersburg and parts of Chesterfield County, Dinwiddie County, Prince George County, and the City of Richmond.

The district overlaps with Virginia's 4th and 7th congressional districts, and with the 62nd, 63rd, 64th, 66th, 69th, 70th, and 71st districts of the Virginia House of Delegates.

Recent election results

2019

2015

2014 special

2011

Federal and statewide results in District 16

Historical results
All election results below took place prior to 2011 redistricting, and thus were under different district lines.

2007

2003

1999

1995

References

Virginia Senate districts
Government in Chesterfield County, Virginia
Dinwiddie County, Virginia
Hopewell, Virginia
Petersburg, Virginia
Prince George County, Virginia
Richmond, Virginia